The Thomas theorem is a theory of sociology which was formulated in 1928 by William Isaac Thomas and Dorothy Swaine Thomas:

In other words, the interpretation of a situation causes the action. This interpretation is not objective. Actions are affected by subjective perceptions of situations. Whether there even is an objectively correct interpretation is not important for the purposes of helping guide individuals' behavior.  

The Thomas theorem is not a theorem in the mathematical sense.

Definition of the situation
In 1923, W. I. Thomas stated more precisely that any definition of a situation would influence the present. In addition, after a series of definitions in which an individual is involved, such a definition would also "gradually [influence] a whole life-policy and the personality of the individual himself". Consequently, Thomas stressed societal problems such as intimacy, family, or education as fundamental to the role of the situation when detecting a social world "in which subjective impressions can be projected on to life and thereby become real to projectors".

The definition of the situation is a  fundamental concept in symbolic interactionism.  It involves a proposal upon the characteristics of a social situation (e.g. norms, values, authority, participants' roles), and seeks agreement from others in a way that can facilitate social cohesion and social action.  Conflicts often involve disagreements over definitions of the situation in question.  This definition may thus become an area contested between different stakeholders (or by an ego's sense of self-identity).

A definition of the situation is related to the idea of "framing" a situation.  The construction, presentation, and maintenance of frames of interaction (i.e., social context and expectations), and identities (self-identities or group identities), are fundamental aspects of micro-level social interaction.

See also 
 Impression management
 Linguistic relativity
 Placebo
 Pluralistic ignorance
 Self-fulfilling prophecy
 Sociology of knowledge
 Tinkerbell effect

References

Further reading 

Sociological theories
Cognitive biases